The Facultad de Filosofía y Letras (School of Philosophy and Literature) or FFyL of the National Autonomous University of Mexico (UNAM) administers eleven divisions of the humanities offering undergraduate and graduate degrees. The Department is one of the largest, and most renowned, literature faculties in the Spanish-speaking world; the Alma Mater of Nobel Laureate Octavio Paz and a number of other important figures in Latin American literature.

History
The direct ancestor of Department was the High Studies National School, founded in 1910 by Justo Sierra as an attempt to establish graduate level degrees and research. The School itself was created fourteen year later hosting four majors: Sciences, Philosophy, Literature, and Historic Sciences. The Department has always been one of the most dynamic schools at the university, adding additional majors along with separating Sciences programs into a new department.

Organization
The School is run by the Dean, currently Jorge Enrique Linares Salgado, PhD., and is divided into eleven divisions offering undergraduate and graduate degrees:

 History
 Classic Philology
 Pedagogy (Education)
 Latin American Studies
 Hispanic Philology
 Philosophy
 Geography
 Theater and Dramatic Literature
 Modern Literature (Italian, German, French, Portuguese, and English)
 Library Science
 Intercultural Development and Management

Location and facilities

The School is located in Ciudad Universitaria in Mexico City, housed in one main complex near the Law School and the Main Library. Department faculty conduct joint research projects with the Instituto de Investigaciones Estéticas (IIE) and the Instituto de Investigaciones Filológicas (IIF). Recently there has also been collaborations with the School of Engineering to develop Media, Arts, and Technology projects.

Graduate programs

Graduate programs are offered in each division, and co-sponsor educational and research programs with other faculties at institutes all over the country.

Famous alumni 

Well-known figures of Mexican and Spanish language literature, culture, and philosophy who have either graduated from the Department, or worked therein:

 Emilio Carballido
 Rosario Castellanos
 Germán Dehesa
 Fernando del Paso
 Elena Garro
 Alberto Gironella
 Margo Glantz
 Jorge Ibargüengoitia
 Carlos Monsiváis
 Thelma Nava
 Octavio Paz
 Jaime Sabines
 Adolfo Sánchez Vázquez 
 Luis Villoro
 Ramón Xirau
 Hector Zagal

References

External links 
, official website 

National Autonomous University of Mexico